Kalmi Baruh (26 December 1896 – 1945) was a Bosnian Jewish scholar in the field of Judeo-Spanish language, pioneer of the Sephardic studies and Hispanic studies in former Kingdom of Yugoslavia.

Life and activities
Kalmi Baruh was born in December 1896 in Sarajevo, in one of the oldest Sephardic families in Bosnia and Herzegovina. He attended elementary school in the town of Višegrad (Вишеград), and has graduated from high-school in Sarajevo. Baruh's academic studies and the PhD - Der Lautstand des Judenspanischen in Bosnien (The Sound System of the Judeo-Spanish in Bosnia) were at Vienna University. He worked as a teacher in the First Sarajevan Gymnasium/High-school, and was the only Balkan Peninsula scholarship recipient from the Spanish Government for the post-doctoral studies in the Spanish Center for Historic Studies in Madrid (1928/9). For a long period of years he worked together with several Yugoslav and European magazines in the field of linguistics and literature, such as: Srpski književni glasnik and Misao, both from Belgrade, Revista de filología Española (Madrid)....  He collaborated with the Institute for Balkan Studies and the University of Belgrade and the Royal Spanish Academy. He translated from Spanish to Serbian   (Enrique Larreta: Slava don Ramira, Jedan život u doba Filipa II, Narodna prosveta, Belgrade, 1933; Jose Eustasio Rivera: Vrtlog, Minerva, Subotica-Belgrade, 1953 ...). Baruh presented some of the less known modern Spanish literature in Yugoslavia and provided reviews for it. He also published linguistic comparative studies, school books and scientific works on philology reviews, especially in Romanic languages. He collected, annotated and explored Judeo-Spanish linguistic forms and romances throughout Bosnia, Priština (Приштина) and Skopje (Скопје). Baruh was one of the pillars of the Sarajevan progressive magazine Pregled, and competent basis for the congregational magazines Jevrejski život and Jevrejski glas, as well as for the cultural-educational society La Benevolencija. He cooperated with Prof. Ernesto Giménez Caballero, Dr. Ivo Andrić, Isidora Sekulić, Žak Konfino, Stanislav Vinaver, Dr. Jovan Kršić, Dr. Moric Levi, Laura Papo Bohoreta and others.

Baruh spoke ten languages, while he wrote his works mostly in Serbian (Serbo-Croatian), then in Judeo-Spanish, Spanish, French and German.

During the 1930s he was an eminent, left-oriented Yugoslav intellectual. Baruh gave special attention to the pupils of poor social background, workers' education, religious tolerance and fought against anti-semitism. He propagated unreserved support for the Republicans during the Spanish Civil War.

He died in Bergen-Belsen Nazi concentration camp.

Works

Most popular works
Španske romanse bosanskih Jevreja (Spanish Ballads of the Bosnian Jews);
El Judeo-Español de Bosnia;
Jevreji na Balkanu i njihov jezik (Jews in the Balkans and their Language);
Španija u doba Majmonidesovo (Spain in the Era of Maimonides);
Španija Filipa II (Spain of Philip the Second);
Španija u književnosti jedne generacije (Spain in One Generation's Literary Fiction);
Miguel de Unamuno;
Islamski izvori Danteove Božanske komedije (Islamic Sources of Dante's Divine Comedy).

Bibliography
Comprehensive international bibliographies that deal with Ladino culture and especially with the Judeo-Spanish language include Kalmi Baruh's bibliography.
In 1971, Prof. Samuel Armistead and Prof. Joseph Silverman from the University of
Pennsylvania in Philadelphia have translated Baruh's Spanish Ballads [Romances] of the Bosnian Jews to English and provided their own work on this scientific paper. Among others Josip Tabak, Dr. Ivo Andrić, Prof. Samuel Kamhi, Prof. Vojislav Maksimović, Dr. Krinka Vidaković Petrov, Prof. Muhamed Nezirović, Dr. Predrag Palavestra, David Albahari, Dina Katan Ben-Zion, Ana Šomlo, Jennie Lebel, Vedrana Gotovac and Alexander Nikolić have written about Baruh.

References

Separate editions of selected Kalmi Baruh's works
Eseji i članci iz španske književnosti, Svjetlost, Sarajevo, 1956;
Izabrana djela, Svjetlost, Sarajevo, 1972;
Selected Works on Sephardic and Other Jewish Topics, Shefer Publishers, Jerusalem, Israel, 2005,  and 2007 .

External links
Judeo-Spanish Ballads from Bosnia by Prof. Samuel G. Armistead, Prof. Joseph H. Silverman 
The Jews in the Balkans and Their Language by Dr. Kalmi Baruh, Institut des Études balkaniques, Belgrade, Knjiga o Balkanu I
Abstract to Kalmi Baruh's The Jews in the Balkans and Their Language by Alexander Nikolić, Scientific Conference – Jews in Macedonia: History, Tradition, Culture, Language and Religion, Macedonian Academy of Sciences and Arts & Jewish Community in the Republic of Macedonia, Skopje
Remembering Kalmi Baruh by Dr. Ivo Andrić, Život I, 3
Kalmi Baruh: Jevreji na Balkanu i njihov jezik - Part I
Kalmi Baruh: Jevreji na Balkanu i njihov jezik - Part II
Široki pogled na svet, Sveske, Pančevo, Vol. 75

1896 births
1945 deaths
Bosnia and Herzegovina Sephardi Jews
Bosnia and Herzegovina people of Spanish descent
Bosnia and Herzegovina writers
Writers from Sarajevo
People from the Condominium of Bosnia and Herzegovina
20th-century linguists
Literary critics
Jewish scientists
Jewish Bosnian writers
Bosnia and Herzegovina Jews who died in the Holocaust
Judaeo-Spanish-language writers
Literary critics of Spanish
People who died in Bergen-Belsen concentration camp
Sephardi Jews who died in the Holocaust
Yugoslav Jews